In Greek mythology, Menestheus  (Ancient Greek: Μενεσθεύς) was a legendary king of Athens during the Trojan War. He was set up as king by the twins Castor and Pollux when Theseus travelled to the Underworld after abducting their sister, Helen, and exiled Theseus from the city after his return.

Family 
Menestheus was the son of Peteus, son of Orneus, son of Erechtheus, one of the early kings of Athens. His mother was called Polyxene or Mnesimache.

Mythology 
Menestheus was one of the suitors of Helen of Troy, and when the Trojan War started he brought "fifty black ships" to Troy. In the Iliad it is noted that no one could arrange chariots and shield-bearing warriors in battle orders better than Menestheus, and that only Nestor could vie with him in that respect. In Herodotus, he is referred to as 'the best man to go to Troy and to draw up and marshal the troops' by the Athenian sent to request aid from Gelon, the dictator of Syracuse.

Yet, further he is characterised as not valiant. When Agamemnon was reviewing his troops he found Menestheus in the back rows seemingly avoiding action. Later when Sarpedon attacked the portion of the Greek wall that he was in charge of, Menestheus shivered and had to call on Telamonian Ajax and Teucer for aid. Menestheus was one of the warriors in the Trojan Horse. After Troy was sacked, he sailed to Mimas, then to Melos where he became king.

When Menestheus died, Athens passed back to the family of Theseus, with Theseus' youngest son Demophon ascending to the throne.

Eponym 
 4068 Menestheus, Jovian asteroid

Notes

References 

 Apollodorus, The Library with an English Translation by Sir James George Frazer, F.B.A., F.R.S. in 2 Volumes, Cambridge, MA, Harvard University Press; London, William Heinemann Ltd. 1921. ISBN 0-674-99135-4. Online version at the Perseus Digital Library. Greek text available from the same website.
 Herodotus, The Histories with an English translation by A. D. Godley. Cambridge. Harvard University Press. 1920. . Online version at the Topos Text Project. Greek text available at Perseus Digital Library.
Homer, The Iliad with an English Translation by A.T. Murray, Ph.D. in two volumes. Cambridge, MA., Harvard University Press; London, William Heinemann, Ltd. 1924. . Online version at the Perseus Digital Library.
 Homer, Homeri Opera in five volumes. Oxford, Oxford University Press. 1920. . Greek text available at the Perseus Digital Library.
 Lucius Mestrius Plutarchus, Lives with an English Translation by Bernadotte Perrin. Cambridge, MA. Harvard University Press. London. William Heinemann Ltd. 1914. 1. Online version at the Perseus Digital Library. Greek text available from the same website.
 Pausanias, Description of Greece with an English Translation by W.H.S. Jones, Litt.D., and H.A. Ormerod, M.A., in 4 Volumes. Cambridge, MA, Harvard University Press; London, William Heinemann Ltd. 1918. . Online version at the Perseus Digital Library
 Pausanias, Graeciae Descriptio. 3 vols. Leipzig, Teubner. 1903.  Greek text available at the Perseus Digital Library.
 Quintus Smyrnaeus, The Fall of Troy translated by Way. A. S. Loeb Classical Library Volume 19. London: William Heinemann, 1913. Online version at theio.com
 Quintus Smyrnaeus, The Fall of Troy. Arthur S. Way. London: William Heinemann; New York: G.P. Putnam's Sons. 1913. Greek text available at the Perseus Digital Library.
Tzetzes, John, Allegories of the Iliad translated by Goldwyn, Adam J. and Kokkini, Dimitra. Dumbarton Oaks Medieval Library, Harvard University Press, 2015. 

Achaean Leaders
Kings of Athens
Kings in Greek mythology
Attican characters in Greek mythology